The 1988 Davis Cup (also known as the 1988 Davis Cup by NEC for sponsorship purposes) was the 77th edition of the Davis Cup, the most important tournament between national teams in men's tennis. This year's tournament marked the introduction of sub-divisions within each continental zone. Each zone would now feature two groups, with promotion and relegation between the two. This year also saw the Eastern Zone renamed as the Asia/Oceania Zone. 75 teams would enter the competition, 16 in the World Group, 13 in the Americas Zone, 16 in the Asia/Oceania Zone, and 30 in the Europe/Africa Zone. Cameroon, Ghana, Haiti, Iraq and Jamaica made their first appearances in the tournament.

West Germany defeated Sweden in the final, held at the Scandinavium in Gothenburg, Sweden, on 16–18 December, to win their first title and become the ninth nation to win the Davis Cup.

World Group

Draw

Final
Sweden vs. West Germany

Relegation play-offs

Date: 8–10 April

Americas Zone

Group I

  are promoted to the World Group in 1989.

  are relegated to Group II in 1989.

Group II

  are promoted to Group I in 1989.

Asia/Oceania Zone

Group I

  are promoted to the World Group in 1989.

  are relegated to Group II in 1989.

Group II

  are promoted to Group I in 1989.

Europe/Africa Zone

Group I

Group II Europe

  are promoted to Group I in 1989.

Group II Africa

  are promoted to Group I in 1989.

References
General

Specific

External links
Davis Cup Official Website

 
Davis Cups by year
Davis Cup
Davis Cup